Nicholas Wykes (c. 1488 – 1558) was the member of Parliament for the constituency of Gloucestershire for the parliament of April 1554.

References 

Members of the Parliament of England for Gloucestershire
English MPs 1554
1480s births
1558 deaths
Year of birth unknown